{{DISPLAYTITLE:C24H32N2O2}}
The molecular formula C24H32N2O2 (molar mass: 380.52 g/mol, exact mass: 380.2464 u) may refer to:

 Eprazinone
 4-Methoxybutyrfentanyl
 R-30490